One on One with Steve Adubato is produced by the Caucus Educational Corporation, which also produces Caucus: New Jersey and New Jersey Capital Report, and it is aired on NJTV, WNET (the network's sister station) and  was formerly aired on FiOS1 New Jersey. One-on-One with four-time Emmy Award-winning anchor Steve Adubato gives insight into today's world. One-on-One discusses compelling, real-life stories and features political leaders, CEOs, television personalities, professors, artists and educational innovators who each share their experiences and accomplishments.

Steve Adubato, host of One-on-One, combines wide-ranging knowledge, a penetrating and inquisitive style and the appreciation for amiable conversation throughout the program. Steve asks questions that inspire the guests to talk beyond their expected route in a manner rarely seen on televised talk shows.

References

External links
Official website

American television talk shows